Ann-Marie Crooks (born September 12, 1965) is a Jamaican-born American former female bodybuilder and professional wrestler. She was previously working for World Championship Wrestling (WCW) in 1999 under the ring name Midnight.

Bodybuilding
As a bodybuilder, Crooks won the Ms. Sunshine State competition in 1992 and placed well in several other bodybuilding events through 1998, finishing as high as 2nd place in the 1994 National Physique Committee (NPC) Nationals (heavyweights).

Professional wrestling
In 1999, she began a short career with World Championship Wrestling (WCW), wrestling under the name Midnight. She acted as the valet and storyline sibling of Harlem Heat's Booker T and Stevie Ray. She trained at the WCW Power Plant. During her time with WCW, she made appearances at Mayhem and Starrcade in 1999, and Souled Out in 2000.

Personal life
Before getting into bodybuilding, Crooks had considered a career in aeronautical engineering but chose to go into the Air Force, where she spent two years in Germany.

She is a licensed realtor. She is married and resides in Florida.

Contest history (bodybuilding)
1992 Ms. Sunshine State - 1st
1993 Ms. Florida - 1st
1993 NPC Nationals - 4th (HW)
1993 IFBB North American Championship - 2nd (HW)
1994 NPC Nationals - 2nd (HW)
1996 NPC Nationals - 3rd (HW)
1998 NPC USA Championship - 4th (HW)
1998 NPC Nationals - 8th (HW)

References

External links 
Official web site (Archived 2009-10-25)
Official Women of Wrestling profile

American female bodybuilders
American female professional wrestlers
Living people
Professional wrestling managers and valets
1965 births
Jamaican emigrants to the United States
21st-century American women
20th-century professional wrestlers